Bikol or Bicol usually refers to:
Bicol Region, the administrative region in the Philippines

Bikol or Bicol may also refer to:

Languages and people
Bikol languages, the languages spoken in the Bicol region in the Philippines
Albay Bikol language, a language of Bicol
Central Bikol language, a language of Bicol
Pandan Bikol language, a language of Bicol
Rinconada Bikol language, a language of Bicol
Bicolano people, the ethnic group

Political parties
Ako Bicol, a political party in the Philippines

Food
Bicol Express, a popular Filipino dish

Hubs of transportation
Bicol International Airport, an airport in Albay province
Bicol Isarog Transport System, a Philippine bus company

Water bodies
Bicol River, the eighth largest river in the Philippines

Newspaper
Bicol Standard, a newspaper in Bicol Region

Educational institution
Central Bicol State University of Agriculture, the regional center for higher learning in agriculture in the Bicol Region
Bicol University, a regional state and research university in Bicol Region, the Philippines
Polytechnic State University of Bicol, a state university in the Philippines

Sports
Bicol Volcanoes, a basketball team

Park
Bicol Natural Park, a protected area of the Philippines located in the Bicol Region

See also
 

Language and nationality disambiguation pages

ceb:Bikol